Kenneth Ross MacDonald (June 29, 1935 – August 22, 2022) was a judge in the Supreme Court of Prince Edward Island. He was also one of the top curlers in the province, representing Prince Edward Island at the 1967, 1976, 1977, 1979 and 1984 Briers.

MacDonald died after a brief illness, on August 22, 2022, in the Royal Infirmary of Edinburgh, Scotland

History 
MacDonald was admitted to the Bar of Prince Edward Island in 1962. In the 1970s, MacDonald worked for a firm named Foster, MacDonald & Carruthers. At this time MacDonald also served as Secretary-Treasurer for the Law Society of Prince Edward Island.

MacDonald retired in August 2001.  Kenneth R. MacDonald continued to do interviews and discuss legal issues in the media following his retirement.

Notable trials 
In 1980, Kenneth R. MacDonald judged MacKinnon v Hashie which has been cited in numerous subsequent cases.

In 1992, MacDonald judged Kane v Canadian Ladies Golf Association, in which Canadian professional golfer Lorrie Kane was permitted to participate in a tournament despite the golf association's former decision that Kane could not participate.

In 2000, MacDonald judged R v MacAulay, a landmark case in Canadian impaired driving law.

References

External links 
 P.E.I. Criminal Rule of Practice for Sentence Reduction

1935 births
2022 deaths 
Dalhousie University alumni
Curlers from Prince Edward Island
Canadian male curlers